Most narrow-gauge railways in Italy were built with Italian metre gauge, which is actually  because historically the Italian track gauge was defined from the centres of the rail instead of the internationally accepted method of measuring the gauge from the inside edges of the rails.
Several metre-gauge lines were built in northern Italy.

123 km  gauge (123 km electrified); 1,290 km  gauge (151 km electrified); 231 km  gauge (2008)

1200 mm gauge
 narrow-gauge railways in Italy are:
Central Funicular in Naples
Gardena Ronda Express

1100 mm gauge
The temporary Mont Cenis Railway (1868–1871) was  gauge.

Metre-gauge lines (1000 mm)

Domodossola–Locarno railway between Domodossola, and Locarno, Switzerland.
Ferrovia Genova–Casella in Genoa, Liguria.
Laas-Lasa freight private railway to a marble cave, that uses a funicular.
Mendel Funicular connecting the Überetsch plateau with the Mendel Pass.
Trieste–Opicina tramway, with a funicular, in the city of Trieste.
Rittnerbahn, or Ferrovia del Renon. in South Tyrol.
Trento–Malè–Marilleva railway In Trentino only the lines from Trento to Malè and Marilleva are still operated by Trentino Trasporti. Recently the line has been renovated and extended to Fucine.

Italian metre-gauge lines (950 mm)
Most in Southern Italy

Calabria
In Calabria there is the Cosenza–Catanzaro Lido railway, with a branch to San Giovanni in Fiore, and two lines from Gioia Tauro. All are owned by Ferrovie della Calabria.

Naples area
Circumvesuviana in the Eastern quadrant of the metropolitan area of Naples, connecting Naples and Sorrento, around the base of Mt. Vesuvius,

Rome
The Rome–Giardinetti railway, in eastern Rome, still operates in 2021. It is the last operational segment of a much longer 950-mm gauge line, the  Rome–Fiuggi–Alatri–Frosinone railway.

Sardinia

In Sardinia, a network of narrow-gauge lines was built, to complement the standard-gauge main network which covered the main cities and ports. The lines were:

Of the lines which are still present, only

still carry regular passenger services, operated by Ferrovie della Sardegna. The others only operate a scenic tourist service known as Trenino Verde (little green train)

In Sassari, the Sassari Tram-train (or Metrosassari) is a 950mm-gauge tramway linking the railway station with the city centre.

Sicily

In Sicily, the Ferrovia Circumetnea railway runs around the Mount Etna. Other  narrow-gauge lines of Ferrovie dello Stato operated, but are now closed. The last of which was the Castelvetrano–Porto Empedocle, closed in 1985.

South-eastern Italy
In the Apulia and Basilicata regions, there are some railway lines connecting Bari, Potenza, Matera, and Avigliano. These are operated by Ferrovie Apulo Lucane.

850 mm gauge line
Menaggio–Porlezza railway in the northern Italian province of Como, closed in 1939.

Bosnian-gauge lines (760 mm)
In Istria, a  narrow-gauge railway line called Parenzana was built from Trieste – Capodistria now Koper Slovenia – to Parenzo now Poreč Croatia (dismantled 1935).
Val Gardena Railway in the Dolomites of northern Italy, closed in 1960.

Decauville gauge (600 mm)
In South Tyrol there are two tourist lines using  gauge trains.

See also

History of rail transport in Italy
Rail transport in Italy

References

Notes

Bibliography

External links

 
Italy, narrow gauge railways